The Iran men's national football team has participated in 14 editions of the AFC Asian Cup, first appearing in the 1968 Asian Cup after automatically qualifying as hosts. Overall, Iran is one of the most successful teams in Asia, having won three titles from 1968 to 1976. However, after the 1976 Asian Cup, Iran's best performance is just third place.

Overall results

1968 Asian Cup
It was Iran's first ever Asian Cup debut, as they were awarded as host. Iran lifted the trophy for the first time.

1972 Asian Cup

Group allocation match

Group A

Semi-finals

Final

1976 Asian Cup

Group B

Semi-finals

Final

It would have been the last time Iran has ever won the title, as for 2019. However, Iran holds record as the most consecutive champion, having won three strait titles comparing to Japan, Saudi Arabia and South Korea, bot have two strait titles.

1980 Asian Cup

Group A

Semi-finals

Third place match

1984 Asian Cup

Group B

Semi-finals

Third place match

1988 Asian Cup

Group A

Semi-finals

Third place match

1992 Asian Cup
The 1992 tournament was considered as the most disappointing tournament for Iran, after ended up in group stage and got eliminated for the first time in the history. It remains as the only time Iran failed to qualify from the group stage.

The last match between Japan and Iran has been a significant subject on the criticism. Iran came to the match with four points, an advantage comparing to its Japanese rival which was forced to gain a win after two draws. However, the match was marred with three red cards for the Iranian team, the first red card in early second half for Jamshid Shahmohammadi in 54' caused drain for the Iranian side when they played only with ten men. In 86', Kazuyoshi Miura scored the decisive goal for Japan that Iranian side had protested to be offside, but instead Nader Mohammadkhani and Farshad Pious were issued red card as well, thus Iran had to play entire of the last minutes with eight players, and eventually, lost 0–1 and eliminated from the competition; Japan went on to win its first Asian title, and marked the rise of Japan as an Asian football power. Many Iranian supporters have continued to hold the match as the biggest robbery in their football history.

Group A

1996 Asian Cup

Group B

Quarter-finals

Semi-finals

Third place match

2000 Asian Cup

Group A

Quarter-finals

2004 Asian Cup

Group D

Quarter-finals

Semi-finals

Third place match

2007 Asian Cup

Group C

Quarter-finals

2011 Asian Cup

Group D

Quarter-finals

2015 Asian Cup

Group C

Quarter-finals

With the third strait defeats in the quarter-finals, Iran had failed to pass through the quarter-finals for three consecutive Asian Cup. Adding with the last time Iran crowned as champion in 1976, Iran had not won the Asian Cup for 43 years.

2019 Asian Cup
Ali Daei, former Iran's international, stated Iran would have to be more confident to win the Asian Cup and ended their 47 years in drought of the title, citing their 2018 World Cup participation as useful to help Iran.

Group D

Round of 16

Quarter-finals

Semi-finals

References

 
Countries at the AFC Asian Cup